Senator O'Daniel may refer to:

Ed O'Daniel (born 1938), Kentucky State Senate
William L. O'Daniel )1923-2017), Illinois State Senate
W. Lee O'Daniel (1890–1969), Texas United States Senate

See also
Senator Daniel (disambiguation)